Alpine skiing at the 2010 Winter Olympics was held in Canada at Whistler Creekside in Whistler, British Columbia, north of Vancouver. The ten events were scheduled for 13–27 February; weather delayed the first event, the men's downhill, two days until Monday, 15 February.

Medal table
Notably absent from the medals in these Olympics were the Austrian men, who had won 8 medals in 2006 and 7 in 2002. France and host Canada were shut out from the podium, as were the German men and the Swiss and Italian women. The U.S. had its best Olympics ever with eight alpine medals, only the fourth nation to achieve that total in a single Olympics (Austria, France, Switzerland).

Individually, three men and five women won multiple medals; triple medalists were Bode Miller of the U.S. and Aksel Lund Svindal of Norway, who both won a medal of each color.  The sole double gold medalist was Maria Riesch of Germany.

Men's events

Women's events

Competition schedule 

All times are Pacific Standard Time (UTC-8).

Course information 

Source:

Athletes

Qualification standards 
The FIS point list used to determine entry into the Olympics was from 18 January 2010.

There could be a maximum of 320 athletes competing in alpine skiing, with no more than 22 per NOC (there was a further limit of 14 male and 14 female per NOC). Additionally, each NOC could enter a maximum of four skiers per event.

To qualify, the competitor had to reach either the "A" or "B" standard.
 "A" qualification standard: the competitor is in the top 500 of the FIS points list in at least one event. If the event is downhill, super-G or super combined, he or she requires at least 120 FIS points.
 "B" qualification standard: if an NOC does not have a male or female athlete that meets the "A" Standard, then they may enter an athlete of that gender in slalom or giant slalom only, provided that the athlete has at most 140 FIS points in the event and has taken part in the FIS Alpine World Ski Championships 2009.

Demographics 

As of 28 February 2010, there were 309 athletes listed as competitors in alpine skiing at the Games, representing 71 countries.

The youngest alpine skier in the 2010 Olympic Games was Ghassan Achi of Lebanon, age 16 at the time of competition (born 28 July 1993). The oldest was Hubertus von Hohenlohe of Mexico, age 51 (born 2 February 1959).

Competing nations 
The following nations have entered the following number of alpine skiers.

See also 
 Alpine skiing at the 2010 Winter Paralympics

References 

 Whistler Weasel Workers – Alpine Race Volunteers for 2010 Olympics
 Alpine Skiing – Sports – Vancouver 2010 
 Qualification for skiing.
 Vancouver 2010 Olympic Winter Games Competition Schedule v12

External links
FIS-Ski.com – alpine skiing – 2010 Winter Olympics – Whistler, Canada
Sports-Reference – 2010 Winter Olympics – Alpine skiing

 
Alpine skiing at the Winter Olympics
2010 Winter Olympics events
Olympics
Alpine skiing competitions in Canada